The men's 800 metre freestyle competition at the 2014 South American Games took place on March 7 at the Estadio Nacional.  The last champion was Lucas Kanieski of Brazil.

This event was a timed-final where each swimmer swam just once. The top 8 seeded swimmers swam in the evening, and the remaining swimmers swam in the morning session.

Records
Prior to this competition, the existing world and Pan Pacific records were as follows:

Results
All times are in minutes and seconds.

The first round was held on March 7, at 11:30, and the final was held on March 7, at 19:00.

References

Swimming at the 2014 South American Games